The list of Argentine footballers in Serie A records the association football players from Argentina who have appeared at least once for a team in the Italian Serie A. Entries in bold denote players still active in actual season.

A
Roberto Aballay – Genoa – 1949–50
Pepito Agosto – Torino, Livorno – 1931–32, 1934–35
Roberto Alarcón – Genoa – 1949–50
Roberto Allemandi – Roma – 1934–35, 1936–37
Matías Almeyda – Lazio, Parma, Inter, Brescia – 1997–2005
Sergio Almirón – Udinese, Empoli, Juventus, Fiorentina, Bari, Catania – 2001–03, 2005–14
Pablo Álvarez – Catania – 2007–14
Ricky Álvarez – Inter, Sampdoria – 2011–14, 2015–18
 Bruno Amione – Verona, Sampdoria – 2022–
Mariano Andújar – Palermo, Catania, Napoli – 2005–06, 2009–15
Cristian Ansaldi – Genoa, Inter, Torino – 2015–22
Juan Antonio – Sampdoria – 2012–13
Santiago Ascacíbar – Cremonese – 2022–23
Roberto Ayala – Napoli, Milan – 1995–2000

B
Abel Balbo – Udinese, Roma, Parma, Fiorentina – 1989–90, 1992–2002
Éver Banega – Inter – 2016–17
Juan Barbas – Lecce – 1985–86, 1988–90
Enzo Barrenechea - Juventus - 2022–
Evaristo Barrera – Lazio, Napoli – 1939–42
Pablo Barrientos – Catania – 2009–14
Gustavo Bartelt – Roma – 1998–2000
José María Basanta – Fiorentina – 2014–15
Oscar Basso – Inter – 1949–50
Gabriel Batistuta – Fiorentina, Roma, Inter – 1991–93, 1994–2003
Carlos Bello – Sampdoria – 1947–48
Fernando Belluschi – Genoa– 2011–12
Gonzalo Bergessio – Catania, Sampdoria – 2010–15
Attilio Bernasconi – Torino – 1933–34
Sergio Berti – Parma – 1992–93
César Bertolo – Torino, Livorno – 1931–32, 1937–38
Nicolás Bertolo – Palermo – 2009–10, 2011–13
Daniel Bertoni – Fiorentina, Napoli, Udinese – 1980–87
Nicolás Bianchi Arce – Pescara – 2012–13
Lucas Biglia – Lazio, Milan – 2013–20
Albano Bizarri – Catania, Lazio, Genoa, Chievo, Pescara, Udinese – 2007–09, 2011–18
Mario Bolatti – Fiorentina – 2009–11
Silvio Bonino – Alessandria, Bari, Livorno – 1936–37, 1938–41
Claudio Borghi – Como – 1987–88
Mauro Boselli – Genoa, Palermo – 2010–11, 2012–13
Rubén Botta – Inter, Chievo – 2013–15
Jonathan Bottinelli – Sampdoria – 2008–09
Elmo Bovio – Inter – 1946–47
Lucas Boyé – Torino – 2016–18
Mario Boyé – Genoa – 1949–50
Juan Brunetta – Parma – 2020–21
Guillermo Burdisso – Roma – 2010–11
Nicolás Burdisso – Inter, Roma, Genoa, Torino – 2004–18
Mauro Burruchaga – Chievo – 2018–19

C
José Luis Calderón – Napoli – 1997–98
Adrián Calello – Siena, Chievo – 2012–14
Juán Calichio – Sampdoria – 1947–48
Salvador Calvanese – Genoa, Catania, Atalanta – 1959–66
Esteban Cambiasso – Inter – 2004–14
Hugo Campagnaro – Piacenza, Sampdoria, Napoli, Inter, Pescara – 2002–03, 2007–15, 2016–17
Antonio Campilongo – Roma – 1939–40
Claudio Caniggia – Verona, Atalanta, Roma – 1988–93
Ángel Capuano – Genoa – 1935–36
Milton Caraglio – Pescara – 2012–13
Ezequiel Carboni – Catania – 2008–11
Franco Carboni – Monza – 2022–
Valentín Carboni – Inter – 2022–
Luis César Carniglia – Sampdoria – 1964–66
Juan Pablo Carrizo – Lazio, Catania, Inter – 2008–09, 2011–17
Eugenio Castellucci – Juventus – 1930–31
José Ignacio Castillo – Lecce, Fiorentina, Bari – 2008–11
Lucas Castro – Catania, Chievo, Cagliari, SPAL – 2012–14, 2015–20
Lucas Castroman – Lazio, Udinese – 2000–04
Sebastián Cejas – Fiorentina, Empoli – 2004–06
Gastón Cellerino – Livorno – 2009–10
Adrián Centurión – Genoa – 2013–14, 2017–18
Alberto Cerioni – Inter – 1946–47
Mauro Cetto – Palermo – 2011–13
José Chamot – Pisa, Foggia, Lazio, Milan – 1990–91, 1993–98, 1999–2003
Cristian Chávez – Napoli – 2011–12
Ezequiel Cirigliano – Verona – 2013–14
Fabricio Coloccini – Milan – 2004–05
José Compagnucci – Bari – 1940–41
Raúl Conti – Juventus, Atalanta, Bari – 1956–61
Gastón Córdoba – Sampdoria – 1998–99
Joaquín Correa – Sampdoria, Lazio, Inter – 2014–16, 2018–
Tino Costa – Genoa, Fiorentina – 2014–16
Hernán Crespo – Parma, Lazio, Inter, Milan, Genoa – 1996–2003, 2004–05, 2006–12
Jonathan Cristaldo – Bologna – 2013–14
Julio Cruz – Bologna, Inter, Lazio – 2000–10
Ernesto Cucchiaroni – Milan, Sampdoria – 1956–63
Leandro Cufré – Roma, Siena – 2002–06
José Curti – Sampdoria, Padova, Triestina, Torino – 1948–56

D
Jesús Dátolo – Napoli – 2008–10
Atilio Demaría – Inter – 1931–36, 1938–43
Félix Demaría – Inter – 1932–33
Germán Denis – Napoli, Udinese, Atalanta – 2008–16
Rodrigo De Paul – Udinese – 2016–21
Oscar Dertycia – Fiorentina – 1989–90
Mario Oscar Desiderio – Catania – 1960–62
Gustavo Dezotti – Lazio, Cremonese – 1988–90, 1991–92, 1993–94
 Ángel Di María – Juventus – 2022–
Christian Díaz – Udinese – 2000–02
Ramón Díaz – Napoli, Avellino, Fiorentina, Inter – 1982–89
Vicente Di Paola – Roma – 1946–49
Juán Docabo – Perugia – 1998–99
Nicolás Domínguez – Bologna – 2019–
Matias Donnet – Venezia – 2001–02
Paulo Dybala – Palermo, Juventus, Roma – 2012–13, 2014–

E
Gonzalo Escalante – Lazio, Cremonese – 2020–23
Juan Esnáider – Juventus – 1998–2000
Iván Esperón – Roma – 1946–47
Juan Esposto – Genoa – 1931–34, 1935–36
Nahuel Estévez – Spezia – 2020–21
Mario Evaristo – Genoa – 1935–36

F
Ernesto Farías – Palermo – 2004–05
Alejandro Faurlín – Palermo – 2012–13
Alberto Fazio – Lazio – 1940–43
Federico Fazio – Roma, Salernitana – 2016–
Federico Fernández – Napoli – 2011–14
Antonio Ferrara – Livorno, Napoli, Inter – 1934–38
Domingo Ferraris – Torino – 1929–30
Ignacio Fideleff – Napoli, Parma – 2011–13
Luciano Figueroa – Genoa – 2007–10
José Florio – Torino – 1951–52
Mauro Formica – Palermo – 2012–13
Élio Fortunato – Perugia – 1980–81
Federico Freire – Catania – 2013–14

G
Fernando Gago – Roma – 2011–12
Adolfo Gaich – Benevento, Verona – 2020–21, 2022–
Antonio Ganduglia – Genoa – 1932–33
Santiago García – Palermo, Novara – 2010–13
Tomás Garibaldi – Genoa – 1939–41
Francisco Garraffa – Livorno – 1934–35, 1937–38
Santiago Gentiletti – Lazio, Genoa – 2014–18
José Giarrizzo – Palermo, Pro Patria – 1953–55
Alejandro Giglio – Genoa – 1930–32
Hugo Giorgi – Bologna – 1947–49
Alejandro Gómez – Catania, Atalanta – 2010–13, 2014–21
Juanito Gomez – Verona – 2013–16
Carlos Gonzáles – Lucchese – 1951–52
Esteban González – Lazio – 2004–05
Ezequiel González – Fiorentina – 2001–02
Kily González – Inter – 2003–06
Mariano González – Palermo, Inter – 2004–07
Nicolás González – Fiorentina – 2021–
Pablo González – Siena – 2011–12
Raúl González – Brescia – 2000–01, 2003–04
Nicolás Gorobsov – Cesena – 2010–11
Ernesto Grillo – Milan – 1957–60
Leandro Grimi – Milan, Siena – 2006–08
Salvador Gualtieri – Lazio – 1940–43, 1945–49
Andrés Guglielminpietro – Milan, Inter, Bologna – 1998–2004
Pablo Guiñazú – Perugia – 2000–01

H
Gabriel Hauche – Chievo – 2012–13
Gabriel Heinze – Roma – 2011–12
Patricio Hernández – Torino, Ascoli – 1982–85
Gonzalo Higuaín – Napoli, Juventus, Milan – 2013–20
Claudio Husaín – Napoli – 2000–01, 2002–03

I
Mauro Icardi – Sampdoria, Inter – 2012–19
Mariano Izco – Catania, Chievo, Crotone – 2006–15, 2016–18

L
Hugo Lamanna – Atalanta – 1941–43
Erik Lamela – Roma – 2011–13
Juán Landolfi – Inter – 1941–42
Joaquín Larrivey – Cagliari – 2007–10, 2011–13
Diego Latorre – Fiorentina – 1992–93
Ezequiel Lavezzi – Napoli – 2007–12
Pablo Ledesma – Catania – 2008–12
Matías Lequi – Lazio – 2004–05
Facundo Lescano – Torino – 2014–15
Sebastián Leto – Catania – 2013–14
Cristian Llama – Catania, Fiorentina – 2007–13
Marcos Locatelli – Torino, Genoa – 1960–65
Nicolás Lombardo – Roma – 1930–33
Miguel Longo – Cagliari – 1964–69
Claudio López – Lazio – 2000–04
Lisandro López – Inter – 2017–18
Maxi López – Catania, Milan, Sampdoria, Chievo, Torino, Udinese – 2009–18
Juan Carlos Lorenzo – Sampdoria – 1948–52
Néstor Lorenzo – Bari – 1989–90

M
José Macrí – Genoa – 1946–47
Lisandro Magallán – Crotone – 2020–21
Juan Maglio – Juventus – 1931–32
Pedro Manfredini – Roma, Brescia, Venezia – 1959–68
Diego Maradona – Napoli – 1984–91
Hugo Maradona – Ascoli – 1987–88
Carlos Marinelli – Torino – 2002–03
Diego Markic – Bari – 1999–2001
Gonzalo Maroni – Sampdoria – 2019–20
Enrique Martegani – Padova, Palermo, Lazio – 1950–54, 1955–56
Lautaro Martínez – Inter – 2018–
Lucas Martínez Quarta – Fiorentina – 2020–
Oscar Massei – Inter, Triestina, Spal – 1955–68
Diego Mateo – Lecce – 2000–01
Carlos Matheu – Cagliari, Atalanta – 2008–09, 2012–13
José Mauri – Parma, Milan, Empoli – 2013–19
Américo Menutti – Bari – 1942–43
Rubens Merighi – Modena, Torino – 1962–64, 1967–68
Raúl Mezzadra – Torino, Venezia – 1940–41, 1942–43
Diego Milito – Genoa, Inter – 2008–13
Nahuel Molina – Udinese – 2020–22
José Montagnoli – Spal – 1954–55
Fabián Monzón – Catania – 2013–14
Ángel Morales – Sampdoria – 1997–98
Maxi Moralez – Atalanta – 2011–16
Adolfo Morello – Padova – 1956–57
Santiago Morero – Chievo – 2008–12
Juan Carlos Morrone – Lazio, Fiorentina – 1960–61, 1963–67, 1969–71
Ezequiel Muñoz – Palermo, Sampdoria, Genoa – 2010–13, 2014–17
Mateo Musacchio – Milan, Lazio – 2017–21
Franco Mussis – Genoa – 2014–15
Juan Musso – Udinese, Atalanta – 2018–

N
Roberto Nanni – Siena, Messina – 2005–06
Nicolás Navarro – Napoli – 2007–09
Mauro Navas – Udinese – 1997–2000
Diego Novaretti – Lazio – 2013–15

O
Mauro Obolo – Piacenza – 2002–03
Lucas Ocampos – Genoa, Milan – 2016–17
Lucas Orbán – Genoa – 2016–17
Rodolfo Orlandini – Genoa – 1930–34
Ariel Ortega – Sampdoria, Parma – 1998–2000
Aldo Osorio – Lecce – 2000–01
Gabriel Oyola – Parma – 2003–04

P
Marcelo Pagani – Messina, Mantova – 1963–65
Mario Paglialunga – Catania – 2012–13
Rodrigo Palacio – Genoa, Inter, Bologna – 2009–21
José Luis Palomino – Atalanta – 2017–
Miguel Ángel Pantó – Roma – 1939–43, 1945–47
Leandro Paredes – Chievo, Roma, Empoli, Juventus – 2013–17, 2022–
Claudio París – Perugia – 2000–02
Facundo Parra – Atalanta – 2012–13
Pedro Pasculli – Lecce – 1985–86, 1988–91
Daniel Passarella – Fiorentina, Inter – 1982–88
Javier Pastore – Palermo, Roma – 2009–11, 2018–21
Nehuén Paz – Bologna, Lecce – 2018–21
Maximiliano Pellegrino – Atalanta, Cesena – 2007–11
Gabriel Peñalba – Cagliari – 2006–07
Luis Pentrelli – Udinese, Fiorentina – 1957–63
Roberto Pereyra – Udinese, Juventus– 2011–16, 2020–
Osvaldo Peretti – Roma – 1947–48
Nehuén Pérez – Udinese – 2021–
Diego Perotti – Genoa, Roma, Salernitana – 2014–20, 2021–22
German Pezzella – Fiorentina – 2017–21
Gino Peruzzi – Catania– 2013–14
Ignacio Piatti – Lecce – 2010–12
Iván Pillud – Verona – 2013–14
Héctor Pineda – Udinese, Napoli – 1997–2002
Anselmo Pisa – Lazio – 1940–41
Silvestro Pisa – Lazio – 1939–43
Pedro Pompei – Sampdoria – 1939–40
Franco Ponzinibio – Inter, Genoa – 1932–33, 1935–37
José Ponzinibio – Milan – 1930–31
Victor José Pozzo – Inter, Atalanta – 1939–42
Juan Pratto – Genoa – 1930–34, 1935–36
Lucas Pratto – Genoa – 2011–12
Francisco Provvidente – Roma – 1939–41
Ignacio Pussetto – Udinese, Sampdoria – 2018–

Q
Facundo Quiroga – Napoli – 2000–01

R
Fernando Redondo – Milan – 2002–04
Gustavo Reggi – Reggina – 1999–2001
Adrián Ricchiuti – Catania – 2009–13
Emiliano Rigoni – Atalanta, Sampdoria – 2018–20
Fabián Rinaudo – Catania – 2013–14
Leonel Rios – Reggina – 2006–07
Emanuel Rivas – Bari– 2009–11
Juan Salvador Rizzo – Inter – 1935–36
José Rodríguez – Salernitana – 1947–48
Gonzalo Rodríguez – Fiorentina – 2012–17
Leonardo Rodríguez – Atalanta – 1992–94
Matías Rodríguez – Sampdoria – 2012–13
Esteban Rolón – Genoa – 2018–19
Cristian Romero – Genoa, Atalanta – 2018–21
Luka Romero – Lazio – 2021–
Sergio Romero – Sampdoria, Venezia – 2012–13, 2014–15, 2021–22
Facundo Roncaglia – Fiorentina, Genoa – 2012–16
Ángel Rosso – Alessandria – 1946–47
Américo Ruffino – Palermo – 1932–33
Oscar Ruggeri – Ancona – 1992–93

S
Mario Sabbatella – Sampdoria, Triestina, Atalanta – 1949–56
Diego Saja – Brescia – 2003–04
Walter Samuel – Roma, Inter – 2000–04, 2005–14
Juan Sánchez Miño – Torino – 2014–15
Mario Alberto Santana – Venezia, Chievo, Palermo, Fiorentina, Napoli, Cesena, Torino, Genoa – 2001–02, 2003–14
Beniamino Santos – Torino, Pro Patria – 1949–52
Javier Saviola – Verona – 2014–15
Lionel Scaloni – Lazio, Atalanta – 2007–08, 2009–15
René Seghini – Bologna – 1956–57
Roberto Sensini – Udinese, Parma, Lazio – 1989–90, 1992–2006
Adalberto Sifredi – Salernitana – 1947–48
Jonathan Silva – Roma – 2017–18
Matías Silvestre – Catania, Palermo, Inter, Milan, Sampdoria, Empoli – 2007–19
Diego Simeone – Pisa, Inter, Lazio – 1990–91, 1997–2003
Giovanni Simeone – Genoa, Fiorentina, Cagliari, Verona, Napoli – 2016–
Santiago Solari – Inter – 2005–08
Juan Pablo Sorín – Juventus, Lazio – 1995–96, 2002–03
José Sosa – Napoli, Milan – 2010–11, 2016–17
Roberto Sosa – Udinese, Napoli – 1998–2002, 2007–08
Víctor Sotomayor – Verona – 1989–90
Matías Soulé – Juventus – 2021–
José Spirolazzi – Milan – 1935–36
Cataldo Spitale – Roma – 1939–41
Nicolás Spolli – Catania, Roma, Carpi, Chievo, Genoa – 2009–19
Guillermo Stábile – Genoa, Napoli – 1930–31, 1932–36
Andrés Stagnaro – Roma – 1933–35
José Surano – Salernitana – 1947–48

T
Juan Tacchi – Torino, Alessandria, Napoli – 1956–61, 1962–63, 1965–66
Leonardo Talamonti – Lazio, Atalanta – 2004–05, 2006–10
Carlos Tevez – Juventus – 2013–15
Fernando Tissone – Udinese, Atalanta, Sampdoria – 2004–11, 2012–13
Pedro Troglio – Verona, Lazio, Ascoli – 1988–92
Roberto Trotta – Roma – 1996–97

V
Juan Vairo – Juventus – 1955–56
Lautaro Valenti – Parma – 2020–21
Nahuel Valentini – Livorno – 2013–14
José Valle – Roma – 1947–50
Leonel Vangioni – Milan – 2016–17
Franco Vázquez – Palermo – 2011–12, 2014–16
Juan Carlos Verdeal – Genoa – 1946–49
Santiago Vernazza – Palermo, Milan, Vicenza – 1956–57, 1959–63
Juan Sebastián Verón – Sampdoria, Parma, Lazio, Inter – 1996–2001, 2004–06
Ricardo Matias Verón – Reggina – 2000–01, 2002–03, 2004–05
Sallustiano Vidál – Lazio – 1947–48
Nelson Vivas – Inter – 2001–03
Carlos Volante – Napoli, Torino – 1931–32, 1933–34

Y
Andrés Yllana – Brescia – 2000–02

Z
Javier Zanetti – Inter – 1995–2014
Mauro Zárate – Lazio, Inter, Fiorentina – 2008–13, 2015–17
Sergio Zárate – Ancona – 1992–93
Luciano Zavagno – Ancona – 2003–04
Bruno Zuculini – Verona – 2017–18
Franco Zuculini – Genoa, Bologna, Verona – 2010–11, 2015–16, 2017–18

See also
List of foreign Serie A players
List of Argentine footballers in Serie B
Oriundo
Serie A Foreign Footballer of the Year

Notes

Italy
Serie A footballers
Expatriate footballers in Italy
Argentine expatriate footballers
Argentine expatriate footballers
Association football player non-biographical articles